Lieutenant General Alvan Cullom Gillem Jr. (August 8, 1888 – February 13, 1973) was a United States Army officer who came from a family with a long military tradition and served in World War I, the Russian Civil War, and World War II.

Early career
After attending the University of Arizona in 1908, Gillem enlisted in the Regular Army in 1910 and served both as a private and a corporal with the 17th Infantry at Fort McPherson. On February 11, 1911, while still at Fort McPherson, he was appointed a second lieutenant of Infantry. He served in the Philippines and later served under Brigadier General John J. Pershing on the Mexican Border in 1916. During World War I, Gillem served with the American Expeditionary Forces in Siberia for eight months from 1918 to 1919.

In 1923, Captain Gillem attended the United States Army Command and General Staff College, followed by the United States Army War College two years later. Then, he taught at the United States Army Infantry School, despite never having graduated there. Following this, he was promoted to major. Gillem was promoted to lieutenant colonel and commanded an infantry battalion for two years. Then he commanded the 66th Infantry Regiment (Light Tanks) for 10 months, the only armored regiment in the United States Army at the time. He was promoted to brigadier general in January 1941 and then given command of the 2nd Armored Brigade. He became the first commanding general of the 3rd Armored Division from April 1941 to January 1942, dubbing it the "Spearhead" division. He received promotion to major general in December 1941.

World War II
Early during World War II, Gillem was mostly stationed stateside. He was given command of the II Armored Corps (later redesignated XVIII Corps) and later the Armored Command at Fort Knox, Kentucky. Gillem commanded the XIII Corps, Ninth United States Army in the European Theater of Operations from September 1944 to September 1945. In June 1945 he was promoted to the rank of lieutenant general. His corps came within 50 miles of Berlin, the closest of all United States troops. He was selected to command the Armored Task Force that was scheduled to invade Japan, but Japan surrendered before the invasion plan was carried out.

Postwar positions

Board for Utilization of Negro Manpower (1945–1946)
From October 1945 to April 1946, Gillem chaired the "Board for Utilization of Negro Manpower" (or Gillem Board). Its report, "Utilization of Negro Manpower in the Postwar Army Policy", was presented in April 1946. It is noted for its recommendations to retain segregation, as that was a policy external to the military, but introduce equal opportunity, as that would be the best use of military manpower.
Recommendations by the Board
 The number of black enlisted men should meet a quota of at least 10% of the Army's size. This would be proportional to the national population.
 Black troops would serve in all-black platoons or companies that would be integrated into all-white battalions. This would be done to share experience and knowledge, which would improve unit quality.
 Black enlisted men who were qualified should attend specialty and technical schools.
 Black commissioned officers would be promoted by the same standards as their white counterparts.

On March 17, 1949, Gillem and John J. McCloy (former Assistant Secretary of War during World War II) testified before the President's Committee on Equality of Treatment and Opportunity in the Armed Services. Gillem served on it from 1949 to 1950.

Command of the Third Army (1947–1950)
Gillem assumed command of the United States Third Army in June 1947. When the Third Army headquarters was moved from Atlanta, Georgia, to Fort McPherson in 1947, Gillem also assumed command of the post. In 1947 Gillem served as an assistant to General George C. Marshall on his Presidential mission to China. He then served as special assistant to the commander of the United States forces in Nanking, commander of the China Service Command in Shanghai, and later American Commissioner in Peking.

Gillem retired from the army in August 1950 with the rank of lieutenant general.

Later life
Upon the end of his military career, Gillen served for four years as executive director of the National Foundation for the March of Dimes in the 1960s.

Gillem died on February 13, 1973, in an Atlanta Hospital at the age of 85. Both he and his wife Virginia (Harrison) Gillem are buried at Arlington National Cemetery, in Arlington, Virginia.

Family
Gillem's grandfather, Alvan Cullem Gillem graduated from West Point in 1851. He served in the Civil War with the Union Army, finishing the war as a brevet major general of United States Volunteers. Gillem's parents were Colonel Alvan Cullom Gillem, Sr., a cavalry officer in the United States Army, and Bessie Coykendall. Both were buried at Arlington National Cemetery.

Gillem had three children: Alvan, Richard, and Mary. The elder son, Alvan Cullem Gillem II, was born in Nogales, Arizona, in 1917, and became a lieutenant general in the United States Air Force, Gillem's second son, Richard D. Gillem, became a lieutenant colonel in the army.

Military awards
 Army Distinguished Service Medal with bronze oak leaf cluster
 Legion of Merit
 Bronze Star Medal
 Mexican Border Service Medal
 World War I Victory Medal
 American Defense Service Medal
 American Campaign Medal
 Asiatic-Pacific Campaign Medal
 World War II Victory Medal
 Army of Occupation Medal
 National Defense Service Medal
 Dutch Grand Officer in the Order of Oranje Nassau (ON.2)

Bibliography

References

External links

 
 Alvan Cullom Gillem Jr. Collection of Documents Regarding Gillem Board and Negroes in the Armed Forces, 1945–1951, Dwight D. Eisenhower Presidential Library 
 Call Me Spearhead – The Official Newsletter of the Association of 3rd Armored Division Veterans. Vol 4, Issue 3 (July 1, 2004)
Generals of World War II
United States Army Officers 1939−1945

1888 births
1973 deaths
United States Army War College alumni
United States Army Infantry Branch personnel
United States Army Command and General Staff College alumni
University of Arizona alumni
United States Army generals of World War II
United States Army generals
Grand Officers of the Order of Orange-Nassau
Recipients of the Distinguished Service Medal (US Army)
Recipients of the Legion of Merit
Burials at Arlington National Cemetery
United States Army personnel of World War I
American military personnel of the Russian Civil War
Military personnel from Tennessee